The Tibeto-Burman migration to the Indian subcontinent started around 1000 BC. The Tibeto-Burman speakers of the subcontinent are found in Nepal, Northeast India, and the Eastern Himalayas.

Origin 
The origin of the Tibeto-Burman speakers was located in the upper course of Yangtse and the Haong Ho (Yellow) rivers in North West China.

Population 

The Tibeto-Burman speaking groups categorised as tribes constitute 12.5% of the total population of Assam, 68.79% in Arunachal Pradesh, 35.14% in Manipur, 94.44% in Mizoram, 86.46% in Nagaland and 31.76% in Tripura.

See also 

 Tibeto-Burman languages
 Sino-Tibetan and Tai peoples of Assam

References

External links 

 Genetic insights into the origins of Tibeto-Burman populations in the Himalayas

Human migration
Historical migrations